Kralyevich Productions, Inc (KPI TV) is an American video production company based in New York City.

The company has won two Primetime Emmy awards for its production of Rome: Engineering an Empire for the History Channel.

It has also produced Weird U.S., Only in America, Deep Sea Detectives, Xtreme Building and Lucha Libre: Life Behind the Mask.

External links

Video production companies